David James Cunningham (born 31 March 1936) is a former Australian politician.

He was born in Glen Huntly, and prior to politics he was an organiser and industrial officer with the Australian Workers' Union. In 1980 he was elected to Melton Shire Council, and he was also Vice-President of the Western Region Commission. A member of the Labor Party, he was elected to the Victorian Legislative Assembly in 1985 as the member for Derrimut, moving to Melton in 1992. He retired in 1999.

References

1936 births
Living people
Members of the Victorian Legislative Assembly
Australian Labor Party members of the Parliament of Victoria
People from Glen Huntly, Victoria
Politicians from Melbourne
Trade unionists from Melbourne
20th-century Australian politicians